The 2017–18 Marshall Thundering Herd men's basketball team represented the Marshall University during the 2017–18 NCAA Division I men's basketball season. The Thundering Herd, led by fourth-year head coach Dan D'Antoni, played their home games at the Cam Henderson Center as members of Conference USA. They finished the season 25–11, 12–6 in C-USA play to finish in fourth place. They defeated UTSA, Southern Miss, and Western Kentucky to become champions of the C-USA tournament. They received C-USA's automatic bid to the NCAA tournament where, as a No. 13 seed, they upset Wichita State in the first round before losing to West Virginia in the second round.

Previous season
The Thundering Herd finished the 2016–17 season 20–15, 10–8 in C-USA play to finish in sixth place. They defeated Florida Atlantic, Old Dominion, and Louisiana Tech to advance to the championship game of the C-USA tournament. There they lost to top-seeded Middle Tennessee. Despite finishing with 20 wins, they did not participate in a postseason tournament.

Offseason

Departures

Incoming transfers

2017 recruiting class

Roster

Schedule and results 

|-
!colspan=9 style=| Exhibition

|-
!colspan=9 style=| Non-conference regular season

|-
!colspan=9 style=| Conference USA regular season

|-
!colspan=9 style=| Conference USA tournament

|-
!colspan=9 style=| NCAA tournament

Source

References

Marshall Thundering Herd men's basketball seasons
Marshall
Marsh
Marsh
Marshall